Adsiz Ada or Dasli Ada, is an islet off the coast of Azerbaijan.

Details
Adsiz Ada is small islet with a maximum length of 0.1 km. Some isolated small rocks are scattered to the east and northeast of this islet.

Although geographically quite far from Baku, this islet is considered part of the Baku Archipelago.

References

External links
Caspian Sea Biodiversity Project

Islands of Azerbaijan
Islands of the Caspian Sea
Uninhabited islands of Azerbaijan